Rubén Astigarraga (born 3 August 1950) is a retired Argentine soccer forward who played in the North American Soccer League, second and third American Soccer League, Major Indoor Soccer League, American Indoor Soccer Association and National Soccer League of Chicago.

Player
In 1979, he signed with the Cleveland Force of the Major Indoor Soccer League. He played two full seasons with the Force, then began the 1981–1982 season before moving to the New Jersey Rockets. While in Cleveland beginning in 1980, he also played the summer outdoor seasons with the Cleveland Cobras of the second American Soccer League. He then played two indoor seasons in Phoenix, one with the Inferno and the second with the Pride. In 1984, Astigarraga signed with the Chicago Vultures of the American Indoor Soccer League. In 1985, he remained in Chicago and spent the summer playing for the Chicago Maroons of the National Soccer League of Chicago. In the fall of 1986, he signed with the Tampa Bay Rowdies of the American Indoor Soccer Association. In January 1987, the Rowdies sold Astigarra's contract to the Memphis Storm. In 1989, he played for the Tampa Bay Rowdies, now playing in the third American Soccer League. Coach Rodney Marsh released him on 24 May 1989.

Coach
In 2009, he was hired as an assistant coach with the Webber International University women's soccer team.

References

External links
 NASL/MISL stats
 Rubén Astigarraga at BDFA.com.ar 
 

1950 births
Living people
Footballers from Buenos Aires
Argentine footballers
Argentine expatriate footballers
Chacarita Juniors footballers
Club Atlético Vélez Sarsfield footballers
Liga MX players
Club Atlético Zacatepec players
Expatriate footballers in Mexico
Expatriate soccer players in the United States
Argentine expatriate sportspeople in Mexico
Argentine expatriate sportspeople in the United States
American Indoor Soccer Association players
American Soccer League (1933–1983) players
American Soccer League (1988–89) players
Chicago Maroons soccer players
Cleveland Force (original MISL) players
Cleveland Cobras players
Major Indoor Soccer League (1978–1992) players
Memphis Rogues players
National Soccer League (Chicago) players
New Jersey Rockets (MISL) players
North American Soccer League (1968–1984) players
Phoenix Inferno players
Tampa Bay Rowdies (1975–1993) players
Tulsa Roughnecks (1978–1984) players
Association football forwards